Moorcrest is a house in Beachwood Canyon, Los Angeles, California, United States. It was built in 1921 for the utopian Krotona Colony in Beachwood Canyon and was designed by Marie Russak Hotchener, an architect who designed several buildings for the Theosophist community; Moorcrest is thought of as one of her most famous pieces.

In the heart of the Hollywood Hills, Moorcrest was once the home of actor Charlie Chaplin, the first international star of the modern era. Later, Mary Astor, the star of The Maltese Falcon among many other films, sometimes lived at Moorcrest. Her parents, Otto and Helen Langhanke, owned the home for a time.

, the house is owned by musician Joanna Newsom and actor Andy Samberg.

References 

Houses in Los Angeles
Houses completed in 1921
Hollywood Hills